The men's 62 kg sambo event at the 2019 European Games in Minsk was held on 23 June at the Minsk Sports Palace.

Results
Legend
 VH – Total victory – painful hold
 VS – Total victory by decisive superiority

Repechage

References

External links
Draw Sheet

Men's 62 kg